Alessandro Fersen (5 December 1911 – 3 October 2001) was a Polish-born Italian dramatist, actor, theater director, author and drama teacher.

He was born as Aleksander Fajrajzen in Łódź to a Jewish family, that moved to Genoa in 1913. He studied at the University of Genoa under Giuseppe Rensi, graduating  in philosophy in 1934 with a thesis later published under the title L'Universo come giuoco ("The Universe as a game"). Due to the racial laws of 1938 he moved to Paris (where he attended the Collège de France) and then in Eastern Europe. Back in Italy in 1943, he participated in the resistance in Liguria, in a partisan group linked to the Italian Socialist Party, before working in Switzerland, where he became friends with Emanuele Luzzati and Giorgio Colli.

He returned to Italy at the end of World War II, and after a period in which he devoted himself to political activity (being a member of the Secretary of the National Liberation Committee of Genoa and Liguria) and journalism (as a collaborator of newspapers Il Lavoro and Corriere del Popolo), in 1947 he began his activity as a theater director with the drama Leah Lebowitz, a  play which he had taken from a Hasidic legend; this play started with the artistic collaboration, which will last decades, with Emanuele Luzzati, with whom founded the "Teatro Ebraico" ("Jewish Theatre"), staging dramas written by him such as Golem (1969), inspired by the Yiddish folklore, or Leviathan (1974), based on the techniques of mnemodrama. 
 
From 1947 Fersen worked for more than a decade for the Teatro Stabile in Genoa, directing adaptations of Shakespeare, Pirandello, Molière, Anouilh, among others. In 1957 he began a career as a drama teacher founding an acting school in Rome, the "Studio di arti sceniche", inspired by the Stanislavski's system. He was also an author of critical and theoretical essays, aimed at an interdisciplinary theater, and an actor active on stage, on television and in films.

Filmography

References

External links 
 Alessandro Fersen Foundation
 

1911 births
2001 deaths
Actors from Genoa
Italian male film actors
Italian male stage actors
Italian male television actors
Polish emigrants to Italy
20th-century Polish Jews
Italian dramatists and playwrights
Italian theatre directors
University of Genoa alumni
Jewish partisans
Jewish male actors
Jewish dramatists and playwrights
20th-century Italian male actors
20th-century Italian dramatists and playwrights